A porticus, in church architecture and archaeology, is usually a small room in a church. Commonly, porticus form extensions to the north and south sides of a church, giving the building a cruciform plan. They may function as chapels, rudimentary transepts or burial-places. For example, Anglo-Saxon kings of Kent were buried in the south porticus at St Augustine's Abbey, with the exception of Eadberht II, who was buried in a similar location in St Mary's Church, Reculver.

This feature of church design originated in the late Roman period and continued to appear in those built on the European continent and, in Anglo-Saxon England, until the 8th century.

References

Footnotes

Notes

Bibliography

Archaeological terminology
Architectural elements
Rooms